Lulua Province may refer to:
 Lulua Province (proposed)
 Lulua Province (former)

Province name disambiguation pages